Alyaksandr Yatskevich (born 4 January 1985) is a Belarusian professional footballer who plays for Krumkachy Minsk.

Honours
Naftan Novopolotsk
Belarusian Cup winner: 2008–09, 2011–12

External links

1985 births
Living people
People from Byaroza District
Sportspeople from Brest Region
Belarusian footballers
Association football forwards
FC Dinamo Minsk players
FC Dinamo-Juni Minsk players
FC Veras Nesvizh players
FC Darida Minsk Raion players
FC Naftan Novopolotsk players
FC Torpedo-BelAZ Zhodino players
FC Belshina Bobruisk players
FC Slutsk players
FC Krumkachy Minsk players